Christel Steffin (born 4 April 1940) is a German former swimmer who competed in the 1956 Summer Olympics and in the 1960 Summer Olympics.

References

1940 births
Living people
German female swimmers
German female freestyle swimmers
Olympic swimmers of the United Team of Germany
Swimmers at the 1956 Summer Olympics
Swimmers at the 1960 Summer Olympics
Olympic bronze medalists for the United Team of Germany
Olympic bronze medalists in swimming
Medalists at the 1960 Summer Olympics
20th-century German women
21st-century German women